David Leblanc (born 31 July 1968) is a retired French breaststroke swimmer. He competed in three events at the 1988 Summer Olympics.

References

External links
 

1968 births
Living people
French male breaststroke swimmers
Olympic swimmers of France
Swimmers at the 1988 Summer Olympics
Sportspeople from Dijon